Last Time I Saw Him is the sixth studio album by American singer Diana Ross, released on December 6, 1973 by Motown Records. It reached #52 in the USA (#12 R&B) and sold over 200,000 copies. It also helped Ross win the 1974 American Music Award for Favorite R&B Female.

The arrangements were by Gene Page, Michael Omartian, Tom Baird, David Blumberg, Bob Gaudio, James Carmichael and Paul Riser. Harry Langdon was credited with the cover photography.

Reception

The album yielded the title track single "Last Time I Saw Him", a multi-format hit that reached #1 (for three weeks) on the Billboard Hot Adult Contemporary, #14 on the Hot 100, and #15 on the Hot Soul singles. It peaked at #9 Pop on the Top 100 lists for both Cashbox and Record World, as well as #10 in Radio & Records. It also reached #35 in the United Kingdom.

"Sleepin'" was the second U.S. single, but despite a vocal performance that had shades of Billie Holiday, only reached #70 Pop and #50 R&B. In the U.K., the chosen 2nd single was the ballad "Love Me" (#38), whose lyrics were replete with double entendres.

"Behind Closed Doors" - previously a US #1 Country hit for Charlie Rich - was also released and became a Top 20 hit in South Africa, reaching number 14 as well as climbing as high as #2 on the singles chart in Zimbabwe. The album also included a cover version of the 60s hit "Turn Around" popularised by Dick and Dee Dee.

"Last Time I Saw Him" was a bit of a musical departure for Ross, with a sound combining country with Dixieland jazz. Shortly after its release, the song was remade by country music star Dottie West, who scored success with the single on the C&W charts, reaching #8.

The album had a disappointing chart run, reaching #52, and would be the last studio album Ross issued in the next three years until the Diana Ross album, released in 1976.

An expanded 2-CD set was issued by Hip-O Select in 2007, including previously unreleased tracks.

Track listing

Original album
"Last Time I Saw Him" (Michael Masser, Pam Sawyer) – 2:50
"No One's Gonna Be a Fool Forever” (Michael Masser, Pam Sawyer) – 3:24
"Love Me" (Tom Baird, Dino Fekaris, Nick Zesses) – 2:56
"Sleepin'" (Terry Etlinger, Ron Miller) – 4:41
"You" (Terry Etlinger, Ron Miller) – 4:19
"Turn Around" (Harry Belafonte, Allan Greene, Malvina Reynolds) – 2:28
"When Will I Come Home to You" (Bob Gaudio, Al Ruzicka, Kathy Wakefield) – 3:14
"I Heard a Love Song (But You Never Made a Sound)" (Bob Gaudio, Brit Gaudio) – 2:32
"Stone Liberty" (Bob Gaudio, Kathy Wakefield) – 2:59
"Behind Closed Doors" (Kenny O'Dell) – 2:46

CD re-issue, limited edition with bonus tracks
Disc 1
"Last Time I Saw Him" (unreleased longer version) (Masser, Sawyer) – 3:10
"No One's Gonna Be a Fool Forever" (Masser, Sawyer) – 3:24
"Love Me" (Baird, Fekaris, Zesses) – 2:56 
"Sleepin'" (Etlinger, Miller) – 4:41
"You" (Etlinger, Miller) – 4:19
"Turn Around" (Belafonte, Greene, Reynolds) – 2:28
"When Will I Come Home to You" (Gaudio, Ruzicka, Wakefield) – 3:14
"I Heard a Love Song (But You Never Made a Sound)" (Gaudio, Gaudio) – 2:32
"Stone Liberty" (Gaudio, Wakefield) – 2:59
"Behind Closed Doors" (O'Dell) – 2:46
"Last Time I Saw Him" [Japanese Quad Edition] (Masser, Sawyer) – 2:54
"No One's Gonna Be a Fool Forever" [Japanese Quad Edition] (Masser, Sawyer) – 3:34  
"Love Me" [Japanese Quad Edition] (Baird, Fekaris, Zesses) – 2:57
"Sleepin'" [Japanese Quad Edition] (Etlinger, Miller) – 4:41
"You" [Japanese Quad Edition] (Etlinger, Miller) – 4:26
"Turn Around "[Japanese Quad Edition] (Belafonte, Greene, Reynolds) – 2:26
"When Will I Come Home to You" [Japanese Quad Edition] (Gaudio, Ruzicka, Wakefield) – 3:13
"I Heard a Love Song (But You Never Made a Sound)" [Japanese Quad Edition] (Gaudio, Gaudio) – 2:36
"Stone Liberty" [Japanese Quad Edition] (Gaudio, Wakefield) – 2:52
"Behind Closed Doors" [Japanese Quad Edition] (O'Dell) – 2:49

Disc 2
"I'll Be Here (When You Get Home)" (Bristol, Brown, Jones) – 3:50
"Why Play Games" (Leonard Caston, Jr., Anita Poree) – 2:41
"I Don't Care Where the Money Is" (Michael Randall) – 2:47
"Get It All Together" (Poree, Sanders, Scarborough) – 4:01
"Where Did We Go Wrong" [Version 1] (Baird, Miller) – 3:52
"Since I Don't Have You" (James Beaumont, Wally Lester, Joe Rock, Jackie Taylor, Joe VerScharen, Janet Vogel) – 3:23
"Let Me Be the One" (Nichols, Williams) – 2:27
"I Want to Go Back There Again" (Chris Clark, Berry Gordy, Jr.) – 3:03
"Old Funky Rolls" [alternate take] (Etlinger, Miller) – 3:47
"Last Time I Saw Him" [original unedited version] (Masser, Sawyer) – 3:39

Charts

References

External links
 Diana Ross - Last Time I Saw Him (1973) album releases & credits at Discogs
 Diana Ross - Last Time I Saw Him (1973) album to be listened as stream on Spotify

1973 albums
Diana Ross albums
Albums arranged by Gene Page
Albums arranged by Paul Riser
Albums produced by Michael Masser
Albums produced by Bob Gaudio
Motown albums